Acidipila dinghuensis  is a chemoorganotrophic, aerobic and non-motile bacterium from the genus of Acidipila which has been isolated from the forest of Dinghushan Biosphere Reserve in the Guangdong Province in China.

References

External links 

Type strain of Acidipila dinghuensis at BacDive -  the Bacterial Diversity Metadatabase

Acidobacteriota
Bacteria described in 2016